Wenzel Faber von Budweis (1455–1518) was an astronomer, astrologer and theologian from Bohemia.

He was the leading author of practicas in the late 15th century, making him one of the most widely printed authors of his time.

References

1455 births
1518 deaths
15th-century astrologers
16th-century astrologers
15th-century German astronomers
16th-century German astronomers
15th-century Bohemian people
16th-century Bohemian people
15th-century German writers